AFL Premiership 2005 is a sports game for PlayStation 2 based on the Australian Football League (AFL). It is the ninth game in the AFL video game series.

Gameplay
The game features two modes: Season mode, where the player selects  one of the 16 teams to play in the 2005 AFL season, and Career Mode,  which includes the pre-season, home and away season, and finals. There is also, player trading, National AFL Draft and player development. AFL Tribunal is also used with in-game reports and suspensions.
The company changed the annual numbering system for titles with the AFL Live Premiership Edition, but this edition would have been AFL Live 2006.

Stadiums and features
The game includes all 16 teams, more than 600 AFL players with updated stats and eight major stadiums which include: 
 New South Wales
SCG (Sydney)
Telstra Stadium (Homebush Bay)

 Queensland
Gabba (Brisbane)

 South Australia
AAMI Stadium (Adelaide)

 Victoria
MCG (Melbourne)
Telstra Dome (Docklands)
Skilled Stadium (Geelong)

 Western Australia
Subiaco Oval (Perth)

Publisher
When Acclaim shut down its operations in Australia, Sony Computer Entertainment (SCEE) took over the publishing and distributing rights to the game. Originally it was only on the PlayStation 2. However, THQ released an Xbox and Microsoft Windows version of the game. The game is only available in Australia.

Critical reception

References

2005 video games
AFL (video game series)
Australia-exclusive video games
PlayStation 2 games
Video games developed in Australia
Video games set in Australia
Windows games
Xbox games
RenderWare games
Sony Interactive Entertainment games
THQ games
Transmission Games games